The Book Item and Component Identifier, or BICI, is a draft standard of the United States National Information Standards Organization (NISO) that would provide a unique identifier for items or components within a book or publication to which an International Standard Book Number (ISBN) has been assigned. It is related to the Serial Item and Contribution Identifier (SICI).

External links
 NISO page for BICI
 NISO draft standard for BICI
 SICI and BICI: Identifiers for Serials and Books

 identifiers